The Coupe de France Final 1981 was a football match held at Parc des Princes, Paris on 13 June 1981, that saw Bastia defeat Saint-Étienne 2–1 thanks to goals by Louis Marcialis and Roger Milla.

Match details

See also
Coupe de France 1980-81

External links
Coupe de France results at Rec.Sport.Soccer Statistics Foundation
Report on French federation site

Coupe
1981
Coupe De France Final 1981
Coupe De France Final 1981
Coupe De France Final
Coupe De France Final